Scutellaria alborosea is a species of flowering plant in the mint family, Lamiaceae. It is endemic to Ecuador, where there are only four known populations.

References

alborosea
Endemic flora of Ecuador
Vulnerable plants
Taxonomy articles created by Polbot